Pygmalion is a 1983 American made-for-Showtime comedy film starring and produced by Margot Kidder as Eliza Doolittle and Peter O'Toole as Professor Henry Higgins.

References

External links

 

1983 films
1983 television films
1983 comedy films
American comedy films
American films based on plays
Films based on works by George Bernard Shaw
Films set in London
Films shot in Toronto
20th Century Fox Television films
Showtime (TV network) films
1980s American films